The  is a professional wrestling championship owned by the DDT Pro-Wrestling promotion. Meant for teams of five wrestlers, the title is believed to be the first of its kind in professional wrestling. The title was first announced on April 30, 2017, with the inaugural champions crowned on August 20, 2017. A unique aspect of the title is that each belt has a different color strap; one belt has a red strap, one blue, one green, one yellow and one pink (retired for the 8-man version).

Like most professional wrestling championships, the title is won as a result of a scripted match. , there have been a total of eight reigns shared between eight different teams consisting of thirty-two distinctive champions and two vacancies. The current holders are Mao, Yuki Ueno, Shunma Katsumata and Toui Kojima from The37Kamiina, and Shinya Aoki who are in their first reign as a team, with Aoki being in his second individual reign.

Title history
Recognizing the difficulty of scheduling matches for the title, DDT announced that as long as the captain of the reigning champions and two other members are present, title matches can be held with two replacement members taking the other two spots in the team. These replacement members would, however, not be recognized as official champions.

On December 21, 2020, the title was vacated and became the KO-D 8-Man Tag Team Championship due to the difficulty of scheduling a proper title defense during the COVID-19 pandemic.

On February 14, 2021, at Kawasaki Strong 2021, the team of Shinya Aoki, Super Sasadango Machine, Antonio Honda and Kazuki Hirata won the vacant title. On March 28, at Judgement, they lost the title in their first defense against Team Thoroughbred (Sanshiro Takagi, Yukio Naya,  and ). On December 28, it was announced that the title would revert back to its original 10-man tag team form with the team of Sanshiro Takagi, Akito, Soma Takao, Gota Ihashi and Yuki Ishida challenging in a 5-on-4 handicap match on January 3, 2022.

Names

Reigns

Combined reigns 

By team

By wrestler

See also
KO-D 6-Man Tag Team Championship

Notes

References

External links
DDT Pro-Wrestling's official website
 KO-D Eight Man Tag Team Championship

DDT Pro-Wrestling championships
Tag team wrestling championships